Jeffery Shaun King (born September 17, 1979) is an American writer and activist. King uses social media to promote social justice causes, including the Black Lives Matter movement.

King was raised in Kentucky and received his undergraduate degree from Morehouse College in Atlanta, Georgia. After briefly teaching high school civics, he became a pastor. King founded a church in Atlanta in 2008 called Courageous Church, which he led for four years. During this time, King launched a number of internet campaigns, including HopeMob.org. He later received a master's degree from Arizona State University. As a writer, King has previously been a regular contributor to Daily Kos, the New York Daily News, and The Young Turks. In 2018, King co-founded the Real Justice PAC, and launched The North Star website. In 2020, King founded the non-profit group Grassroots Law Project.

King has repeatedly faced accusations of fiscal mismanagement and of raising money from donors which does not reach its intended recipients. In addition, the Grassroots Law Project has been questioned for the high compensation paid to King and his associates, and its lack of progress on its main initiative.

Early life and education
Jeffery Shaun King was born in Franklin, Kentucky and raised in Versailles, Kentucky. Although his birth certificate names Jeffery Wayne King as the father, King stated in 2015 that his mother told him his actual biological father is a light-skinned black man. By second grade, King's mother, Naomi Kay (Fleming) King, was raising King and his brother as a single parent. King attended Huntertown Elementary School and Woodford County High School.

King has stated that he was the victim of racism and hate crimes while growing up in Kentucky. He told reporters that one day a pickup truck full of youths attempted to run him over with the vehicle on school property. King recalls that after reporting the incident to school authorities, the authorities protected the youths rather than punishing them. King later said that a second assault occurred, wherein "a dozen self-described 'rednecks'" beat him and the injuries caused him to miss a portion of two years of high school due to multiple spinal surgeries. King characterized the assault as a racially motivated hate crime. In 2015, media outlets questioned King's account of the assault and, citing interviews with the investigating detective Keith Broughton and police reports on the case, characterized the fight as a one-on-one between King and another boy over a girl and that the injuries were minor. Broughton reportedly interviewed multiple witnesses, including a teacher who broke up the fight. A band teacher, two fellow students from King's high school, as well as King's wife, posted their recollection of the event to Facebook, backing King's account.

King attended Morehouse College, a private, historically black men's college in Atlanta, Georgia, where he majored in history. In 1999, King was elected president of the student government association. Midway through his education, he had to take a medical leave. Upon his return, he was named an Oprah Winfrey Scholar by Morehouse. In 2018, King earned a master's degree in history from Arizona State University.

Career
After graduation, King was a high school civics teacher for about a year and then worked in Atlanta's juvenile justice system. King left teaching and worked as a pastor at Total Grace Christian Center in DeKalb County, Georgia. King relates that he had been inspired to become a pastor when he was in high school; while King was recovering from injuries after an assault, King was regularly visited by his best friend's father, who was a pastor. He recalled growing up without a father figure and said, "I just found myself so impacted by this man coming to visit me that I wanted to be like him.” In 2008, King founded a church in Atlanta called "Courageous Church". He made use of social media to recruit new members and was known as the "Facebook Pastor". In 2012, King resigned from the Courageous Church, citing personal stress and disillusionment.

Journalism
King has written extensively about his experiences as a biracial person, and has also written about the Black Lives Matter movement, gaining prominence during the events following the shooting of Michael Brown. King wrote an article analyzing the Brown crime scene, and argued that the evidence suggested that officer Darren Wilson's life was not in danger during the shooting.

King became a contributing blogger for the politically liberal website, the Daily Kos, in September 2014. On October 2, 2015, King joined New York Daily News as a senior justice writer, where focused on reporting and commentary on social justice, police brutality and race relations. On December 28, 2016, Cenk Uygur announced that King had been hired as a political commentator for The Young Turks. King left the Daily News in August 2017. 

In 2019, King launched the crowdfunded website The North Star, calling it an online revival of the anti-slavery newspaper of the same name, and saying that he had the support of relatives of Frederick Douglass, the original paper's editor. The site has articles, podcast episodes, and videos for a subscription fee, with a focus on social justice issues such as police brutality and mass incarceration. The Daily Beast reported that the site did not deliver all the features that were promised to fundraisers, such as a daily video broadcast and an app. King said he had been overzealous with the project and that he should have listened to advisors who told him that his plans for the site were too ambitious. After leaving The North Star, historian and former editor-in-chief Keisha Blain accused King of being "a liar & a fraud" but said that she was prevented from saying much because of a non-disclosure agreement. Another former employee claimed that employees had to fight for months to receive health care benefits they were promised, while King claimed that all employees received full health care coverage. Former co-workers at The North Star described King as a poor fiscal manager, absent, and incompetent, according to The Daily Beast.

Activism
In August 2015, King launched Justice Together, an organization to identify police brutality and lobby local politicians for change. He unilaterally disbanded the organization in the fall of 2016 to the surprise of many of the group's members. In September 2016, King proposed an Injustice Boycott for December of that year.

In 2018, King co-founded Real Justice PAC, a political action committee to help elect prosecutors who support criminal justice reform at the county and city levels.

Arrest of DeAndre Harris' attackers
In an October 11, 2017, article in The Washington Post, King was credited with leading a successful months-long and far-reaching social media campaign which led to the identification and arrest of three of the men behind the August 12, 2017, assault on DeAndre Harris during the Unite the Right rally. Three men were arrested for the parking-garage beating. Two were subsequently convicted while two others are awaiting trial.

False accusations against trooper

On May 20, 2018, King accused a white Texas state trooper of sexually assaulting Sherita Dixon-Cole, a Black human resources professional. The trooper arrested Dixon-Cole for drunk driving, and King based his accusation on statements she and her family made to King and Philadelphia-based lawyer S. Lee Merritt. King's social media posts, which identified the trooper by name, went viral, and "substantial harassment and threats" were made against the arresting trooper as well as another trooper with the same last name. The Texas Department of Public Safety subsequently released nearly two hours of bodycam footage on May 22 that exonerated the trooper. Merritt subsequently apologized for the false accusation and national attention he had brought to the case. King deleted his social media posts after the body-cam video was released.

Jazmine Barnes shooting 
Seven-year-old Jazmine Barnes was killed in a drive-by shooting in Houston at 7 a.m. December 30, 2018. The unknown assailant pulled up alongside the family's truck and opened fire, injuring the mother and other child. King and former classmate S. Lee Merritt offered a $25,000 award for information leading to an arrest of the unknown suspect. After no information for 24 hours, the reward was later raised to $60,000, with $35,000 from their private funds, and an additional $25,000 from donors. Police credited King with providing a tip that helped lead them to suspect Eric Black Jr., who later admitted he was involved in the shooting.

On Twitter, King initially posted the mugshot of a white male, Robert Paul Cantrell, who he identified as involved in the shooting. King said in a deleted tweet, "We've had 20 people call or email us and say he is a racist, violent asshole and always has been. Just tell me everything you know." Police later said the man was not connected with the crime, and King deleted the tweet, though not until the man had received threats on social media. The incident was revived in late July 2019 when Cantrell committed suicide in his jail cell, where he was being held on separate robbery and evasion charges. Just before he died, he allegedly told his lawyer that he was concerned about the death threats his family was still receiving in the aftermath of his false involvement in Jazmine Barnes’ murder.

Fundraising activities and disputes
King has repeatedly faced accusations from colleagues and fellow activists of raising money for unclear purposes, or overpromising results from fundraising. He has also faced calls of fiscal mismanagement, inattention to his projects, and "radical incompetence."

In March 2010, while still a pastor, he founded aHomeinHaiti.org as a subsidiary of Courageous Church and used eBay and Twitter to raise $1.5 million to send tents to Haiti after the 2010 Haiti earthquake. Desperate Housewives star Eva Longoria was a spokesperson for the campaign. King's work for Haiti inspired him to launch TwitChange.com, a charity auction site. TwitChange held Twitter charity auctions on eBay where celebrities offered to retweet winning bidders' tweets in exchange for support of a particular charity. One campaign raised funds to build an orphanage in Bonneau, Haiti. In 2010, TwitChange won the Mashable Award for "Most Creative Social Good Campaign".

In 2011, King asked for donations to him online to climb the Seven Summits, but abandoned the effort only a few days into training. 

In 2012, King and web designer Chad Kellough founded HopeMob.org, a charity site that used voting to select a particular person's story and then raise money for that story until its goal was met. The money went to an organization which provided for the person's needs, not to the person individually. After one goal was met, the next story in line would then get funds raised. HopeMob initially raised funds to build their platform in January 2012 on the crowdfunding site Kickstarter. Their campaign raised about $125,000.

King has also raised money for multiple causes incidents where the Black Lives Matter movement has been involved, including the shooting of Tamir Rice. Through the fund-raising website, YouCaring.com, King raised $60,000 for Rice's family after the 12-year-old Cleveland, Ohio resident was killed in 2014 by two city policemen After learning that Rice had not been buried as of five months after the shooting and that Rice's mother had moved into a homeless shelter, he started the fund to assist the Rice family. In May 2015, however, family attorney Timothy Kucharski stated that neither he nor the Rice family had heard of King or the fundraiser, and they had not received any money. The money raised was then seized by the court and placed into Tamir Rice's estate instead of being freely available to the family. Rice's mother publicly called out King, saying “Personally I don’t understand how you sleep at night." King and the Rice family's new legal counsel, Benjamin Crump, then started a second charity drive with the proceeds going directly to the family. An additional $25,000 was raised.

King has been accused of raising funds for causes that were never received by those he was fundraising for, including at Justice Together after King abruptly closed the organization. A former member of the organization who asked to have a donation returned said that King refused to refund her money. An investigation by Goldie Taylor of The Daily Beast detailed discrepancies in amounts raised for different charities such as a Haiti relief project, and in one case, starting a crowdfunding project for the family of Tamir Rice without their knowledge. Activists on Twitter questioned if he took the $100,000 reward money for information that led to the arrest of the men who shot Jazmine Barnes. On September 12, 2019, Black Lives Matter activist DeRay Mckesson wrote a lengthy article raising multiple concerns in regards to King, especially related to fundraising.

King has denied all allegations of wrongdoing. On January 15, 2019, he tweeted that he was pursuing legal action against social justice activists on Twitter who questioned his previous fundraisers, and his attorneys later sent cease-and-desist letters. David Dennis Jr. wrote in NewsOne that the purpose of the cease-and-desist letters seemed to be "old-fashioned intimidation and forcible silencing". King wrote an editorial explaining the purpose of taking legal action and addressed some specific critiques levied against him.

Twitter comments on depictions of Jesus
In June 2020, King tweeted that statue, murals, and stained-glass windows depicting a white Jesus should be removed. "I think the statues of the white European they claim is Jesus should also come down," he tweeted. "They are a form of white supremacy. Always have been." King's comments quickly drew condemnation from some on Twitter, including several prominent conservative figures. The tweet has since been deleted.

Grassroots Law Project 
In 2020, King and Lee Merritt founded the Grassroots Law Project. In its first year, the organization raised over $6.5 million. More than $2.5 million went to the non-profit's most-publicized program, setting up unofficial Truth and Reconciliation Commissions in three American cities. However, after two years, none of the commissions appeared to be active or exist. In addition, according to The Daily Beast, the group faced faced scrutiny for the high compensation received by King (more than $250,000) and others. In addition, the organization's complex relationship with the Grassroots Law PAC raised questions about tax and regulatory arrangements.

Politics
King left the Democratic Party after the 2016 election, alleging corruption and lack of neutrality during the 2016 primaries. In 2018, Shaun King expressed disdain for Kamala Harris and said he did not intend to support her or Joe Biden in the Democratic primaries due to their positions on criminal justice. He later changed his view as he said her stance has changed, tweeting, "I am incredibly proud to see a brilliant Black woman, and HBCU grad, chosen as a Vice Presidential nominee. I've done political work my whole life. It's rarely things dreams are made of. Kamala Harris is the most progressive VP nominee in American history...She has improved drastically on all justice & policing-related issues since she was last District Attorney in 2011.”

Personal life
King is married, with five children. Three of his children were conceived with his wife, and two were adopted. He also has had foster children, nieces, and nephews living with him.

References

External links

1979 births
Living people
African-American activists
Activists from Kentucky
African-American Christian clergy
Black studies scholars
American political writers
Arizona State University alumni
Black Lives Matter people
Christians from Georgia (U.S. state)
American civil rights activists
Morehouse College alumni
New York Daily News people
People from Woodford County, Kentucky
Politics and race in the United States
The Young Turks people